Munhoz ( or ) is a Portuguese-language surname that originated from the Spanish-language variant Muñoz. Notable people with the surname include:

Pablo Munhoz (born August 31, 1982), Uruguayan footballer
Pedro Munhoz (born September 7, 1986), Brazilian mixed martial artist

See also
Munhoz, municipality in Brazil
Munhoz de Melo, municipality in Brazil

Portuguese-language surnames